Events from the year 1367 in Ireland.

Incumbent
Lord: Edward III

Events
 Thomas le Reve, Bishop of Waterford and Lismore appointed Lord Chancellor of Ireland.
Attack on the city of Waterford, killing over one hundred people, by the Poers, an English family.

Births

Deaths

References

 
1360s in Ireland
Ireland
Years of the 14th century in Ireland